Wierzbica  is a village in Radom County, Masovian Voivodeship, in east-central Poland. It is the seat of the gmina (administrative district) called Gmina Wierzbica. The village has a population of 1,900, and belongs to historic Polish province of Lesser Poland. Wierzbica was a town from 1469 to 1870. For most of its history, it belonged to Lesser Poland’s Sandomierz Voivodeship.

History
Wierzbica was first mentioned in the year 1198, in a document issued by Bishop of Kraków Gedko. The bishop described in it rules of religious tax (tithe), paid for monasteries at Miechów and Wąchock. The Order of Cistercians from Wąchock probably founded wooden church of Saint Giles at Wierzbica, which became the center of a Roman Catholic parish.  At that time, the village of Wierzbica belonged to the abbots of the Wąchock Monastery, together with Iłża and Tarczek. In 1229, Princess Grzymislawa of Luck, together with her son Boleslaw V the Chaste, met here with Prince Konrad I of Masovia and several church leaders. Wierzbica remained property of the Cistercians from Wąchock until the late 18th century.

The village received Magdeburg rights from King Kazimierz Jagiellończyk in Radom, on July 12, 1469, upon request of Abbot Jakub from Wąchock. Residents of the newly founded town were allowed to create their own local council, and to make weekly markets on Saturdays, as well as three fairs annually (April 11, July 25 and September 14). The town quickly developed, enjoying the support of the powerful Wąchock Monastery, and in the late 15th century, it was larger than local urban centers of Radom and Iłża. In 1502, King Aleksander Jagiellończyk confirmed all privileges for Wierzbica, and in the mid-16th century, King Zygmunt II August extended them to the village of Rzeczków, located in the suburbs of the town. In the Polish Golden Age Wierzbica prospered, due to location on a local merchant route Opoczno – Skrzynno - Szydłowiec – Jastrząb – Wierzbica, with additional routes to Iłża, and Skaryszew.

Until the Partitions of Poland (1795), Wierzbica remained in Sandomierz Voivodeship. In 1795 - 1807 it belonged to the Habsburg Empire, and in 1807 - 1815 to the Duchy of Warsaw, which became Russian-controlled Congress Poland. The town declined in the 19th century, and after the January Uprising, Russian government reduced its status to that of a village. It still remains a village, with one characteristic feature of a town, which is a medieval market square.

Economy
In 1952 - 1955, the government of People's Republic of Poland, with Soviet cooperation  built here Cement Plant “Friendship”, based on Soviet technology. The name of the plant was in 1989 changed into “Wierzbica”. In 1996 the plant was purchased by a French concern Lafarge, which closed it on October 12, 1997, despite the fact that the plant had been profitable in 1992 - 1996.

Among points of interest there is a parish church of St. Stanislaus (18th century), the 19th century cemetery, and several wooden houses from the early 19th century. Wierzbica has a football team Orzeł.

References

Wierzbica